Automatic Transmitter Identification System (ATIS) can refer to:
 Automatic Transmitter Identification System (marine), for VHF radios operating on European inland waterways
 Automatic Transmitter Identification System (television), used with satellite television broadcasts